The Melbourne skate (Spiniraja whitleyi) is a species of fish in the belonging to the skate family Rajidae. It is endemic to southern Australia.  Its natural habitat is open seas. It is found at depths up to 345 meters.

References 

Melbourne skate
Marine fish of Southern Australia
Melbourne skate